Cambodunum is a Latinized Celtic placename which may refer to:

 Cambodunum (Britain), present-day Slack, West Yorkshire
 Cambodunum (Germany), present-day Kempten